The Pyotr Alexeyev Resistance Movement (DSPA) was a left-wing political organization in Russia. It was created in 2004 by Dmitry Zhvania, a journalist and political activist from Saint Petersburg. The DSPA's main activities took place in Saint Petersburg, with several divisions in other cities. The movement was named after revolutionary worker Petr Alekseev.

Ideology objectives
DSPA members believed the expansion of capitalism leads to greater exploitation of poor people, the growth of social inequality, lost freedom and ecological disasters. The DSPA proposed an alternative society based on a socialist planned economy and rational use of resources with the mandatory cultivation of civil and working self-management.

The DSPA stood up for non-violent campaigns of direct action and socialist agitation, providing “here and now” events using available resources.  The movement’s ideology rejected the rise to power of the organized group. The main objective of the DSPA’s activities was organizing a large-scale civil resistance movement.

Other objectives

Involvement in a struggle for rights of ordinary citizens: workers, students, local civil groups
Explanation of unity of interests of working organizations and civil groups
Propaganda of socialist ideals among grassroots social movements

All decisions within the movement were taken by consensus. Anyone who agreed with the DSPA’s charter and participated in the movement’s actions was considered a DSPA member.

History
Before organizing its “here-and-now” campaigns, the movement had a preparation period. During this period all members discussed the movement’s theory, ideology and practice, and established relations with other left-wing groups and organisations.

The main line of activity of the DSPA was street campaigns. On average, in a month the movement provided 3-4 “here-and-now” actions. The DSPA considered that such actions would draw people’s attention to socially relevant issues, and made these issues a subject of public discussion.

Cooperation with working and civil movements
Along with street campaigns, DSPA took part in labor movements and in civil initiatives directed against illegal construction. In 2011, DSPA representatives attended the founding conference of the Russian Socialist Movement.

References

External links
DSPA web-site(in Russian)
LJ-community (in Russian)

2004 establishments in Russia
2012 disestablishments in Russia
Defunct organizations based in Russia
Far-left politics in Russia
Organizations disestablished in 2012
Organizations established in 2004
Russian democracy movements
Socialist organizations in Russia